The culture of the Tlingit, an Indigenous people from Alaska, British Columbia, and the Yukon, is multifaceted, a characteristic of Northwest Coast peoples with access to easily exploited rich resources. In Tlingit culture a heavy emphasis is placed upon family and kinship, and on a rich tradition of oratory. Wealth and economic power are important indicators of status, but so is generosity and proper behavior, all signs of "good breeding" and ties to aristocracy. Art and spirituality are incorporated in nearly all areas of Tlingit culture, with even everyday objects such as spoons and storage boxes decorated and imbued with spiritual power and historical associations.

Kinship
The Tlingit kinship system, like most Northwest Coast societies, is based on a matrilineal structure, and describes a family roughly according to Morgan's Crow system of kinship. The society is wholly divided into two distinct moieties, termed Raven (Yéil) and Eagle/Wolf (Ch'aak'/Ghooch). The former identifies with the raven as its primary crest, but the latter is variously identified with the wolf, the eagle, or some other dominant animal crest depending on location; occasionally this moiety is simply called the "not Raven" people. There is a general tendency among younger Tlingits of identifying all Eagle/Wolf clans with eagle in preference to wolf or other crests, something deprecated by most elders but reinforced by modern associations between Tlingit and their Tsimshian and Haida neighbors. Members of one moiety traditionally may only marry a person of the opposite moiety, however in the last century this system began to break down (as a result of violent suppression of Tlingit culture and traditions) and today so-called "double-eagle" and "double-raven" marriages are common, as well as marriages with non-Tlingit people. No word in Tlingit refers to moiety, since referring to a particular person by their clan membership (see below) is enough to determine their moiety affiliation. In colloquial English the term "side" is often used among the Tlingit since "moiety" is a specialized term unfamiliar to most.

The moieties provide the primary dividing line across Tlingit society, but identification is rarely made with the moiety. Instead individuals identify with their matrilineal clan (naa), a large group of people related by shared genealogy, history, and possessory rights. Clan sizes vary widely, and some clans are found throughout all the Tlingit lands whereas others are found only in one small cluster of villages. The Tlingit clan functions as the main property owner in the culture, thus almost all formal property amongst the Tlingit belongs to clans, not to individuals. Due to the decline in traditional knowledge among the younger generations (as a result of violent suppression of Tlingit culture and traditions), many young urban Tlingit people are uncertain of their exact clan affiliation, and may simply refer to themselves by one or the other moiety. If they become more familiar with traditional cultural practice they either discover and research their clan or are formally adopted into an appropriate clan in the area.

Because of the heavy emphasis on clan and matrilineal descent, the father played a relatively minor role in the lives of his children. Instead, what Europeans would consider the father's primary role was filled by the mother's brother, the children's maternal uncle, who was of the same clan as the children. This man served as caretaker, teacher, and disciplinarian. The father had a more peripheral relationship with the children, and as such many Tlingit children have very pleasant memories of their fathers as generous and playful, while they maintain a distinct fear and awe of their maternal uncles who exposed them to hard training and discipline.

Beneath the clans are houses (hít), smaller groups of people closely related by family, and who in earlier times lived together in the same large communal house. The physical house itself would be first and foremost property of the clan, but the householders would be keepers of the house and all material and non-material goods associated with it. Each house was led by a "chief," in Tlingit hít s'aatí "house master", an elder male (or less often a female) of high stature within the family. Hít s'aatí who were recognized as being of particularly high stature in the community, to the point of being major community leaders, were called aan s'aatí or more often aankháawu, "village master" or "village leader". The term aan s'aatí is now used to refer to an elected city mayor in Tlingit, although the traditional position was not elected and did not imply some coercive authority over the residents.

The existence of a "chief" for every house lineage in a village confused many early European explorers and traders who expected a single autocratic "chief" in a given village or region. This led to numerous confrontations and skirmishes among the Europeans and Tlingit in early history, since a particular "chief" could only hold sway over members of his own household and not over others in the village. A high stature hít s'aatí could convince unrelated villagers to behave a certain way, but if he lost significant status the community would begin to ignore him, much to the dismay of Europeans who were depending on his authority.

The hít s'aatí is usually the caretaker and administrator of house property, as well as some or most clan property in his region. He may often refer to himself as the "slave" of clan and house valuables and regalia because his position is not one of true ownership. Instead the position is more like that of a museum curator, one who has some say in whether or not a particular item is to be used or displayed, but who does not truly own that item and who may not dispense with it, sell it, or destroy it without the consultation of other family members. The hít s'aatí is also responsible for seeing the clan regalia brought out regularly at potlatches where the value and history of these items may be reconfirmed through ceremonial use and payments to the opposite clans. The funds for these potlatches may come primarily from the hít s'aatí, and as such the regalia that represent his ancestors can be seen as spending his money for him.

Historically, marriages among Tlingits, and occasionally between Tlingits and other tribes were arranged. The man moved into the woman's house and became a member of that household. He contributed to communal food gathering and had access to his wife's clan's resources. Because the children were of the mother's clan, marriages were often arranged such that the man married a woman of the same clan as his father, though not a close relation. This constituted an ideal marriage in traditional Tlingit society, where the children were of the same clan as their paternal grandfather and could thus inherit his wealth, prestige, names, occupation, and personal possessions.

Because often the grandparents, particularly grandfathers, had a minimal role in the upbringing of their own children, they took an active interest in the upbringing of their grandchildren, and are noted for doting upon them beyond reason. This is usually exemplified by the story of Raven stealing daylight from his putative grandfather, who gave him the moon and the stars, and despite losing both of them to Raven's treachery, gave him the sun as well simply because he was a favored grandchild.

Any Tlingit is a member of a clan, be it by birth or adoption. Many Tlingits are children of another clan, the clan of their fathers. The relationship between father and child is warm and loving, and this relationship has a strong influence on the relation between the two clans. During times of grief or trouble the Tlingit can call on his father's clan for support at least as much as he can call on his own. His father's clan is not obliged to help him, but the familial connection can be strong enough to alienate two clans in the same moiety. This situation is well documented in oral history, where two clans of opposite moieties are opposed in war—one clan may call upon a related clan of the same moiety for assistance only to be refused because of a father's child among its enemies.

The opposition of clans is also a motivator for the reciprocal payments and services provided through potlatches. Indeed, the institution of the potlatch is largely founded on the reciprocal relationship between clans and their support during mortuary rituals. When a respected Tlingit dies the clan of his father is sought out to care for the body and manage the funeral. His own clan is incapable of these tasks due to grief and spiritual pollution. The subsequent potlatches are occasions where the clan honors its ancestors and compensates the opposite clans for their assistance and support during trying times. This reciprocal relationship between two clans is vital for the emotional, economic, and spiritual health of a Tlingit community.

Property

In Tlingit society, many things are considered property that in other societies would not be. This includes names, stories, speeches, songs, dances, landscape features (e.g., mountains), and artistic designs. These notions of property are similar to those described by modern intellectual property law. More familiar property objects are buildings, rivers, totem poles, berry patches, canoes, and works of art. The Tlingit have long felt powerless to defend their cultural properties against depredation by opportunists, but have in recent years become aware of the power of American and Canadian law in defending their property rights and have begun to prosecute people for willful theft of such things as clan designs.

It is important to note that in modern Tlingit society two forms of property are extant. The first and foremost is unavoidably that of the American and Canadian cultures, and is rooted in European law. The other is the Tlingit concept of property as described here. The two are contradictory in terms of rightful ownership, inheritance, permanence, and even in the very idea of what can be owned. This is the cause of many disagreements both within the Tlingit and with outsiders, as both concepts can seem to be valid at the same time. The Tlingit apply the indigenous concept of property mostly in ceremonial circumstances, such as after the death of an individual, the construction of clan houses, erection of totem poles, etc. The situation of death can be problematic however since Tlingit law dictates that any personal property reverts to clan ownership in the absence of any clan descendants who can serve as caretakers. This, of course, contradicts European legal interpretation, under which property reverts to the state in the absence of legal heirs. However, the two may be considered to be consistent, in that the clan serves as the essence of a Tlingit concept of state. Obviously such matters require careful consideration by both Tlingit familiar with the traditional laws and by the governments involved.

Myriad art forms are considered property in Tlingit culture. The idea of copyright applied to Tlingit art is inappropriate, since copyright is generally restrictive to particular works or designs. In Tlingit culture, the ideas behind artistic designs are themselves property, and their representation in art by someone who cannot prove ownership is an infringement upon the property rights of the proprietor.

Stories are considered property of particular clans. Some stories are shared freely but are felt to belong to a particular clan, other stories are clearly felt to be restricted property and may not be shared without a clan member's permission. Certain stories are however essentially felt to be in the public domain, such as many of the humorous tales in the Raven cycle. The artistic representation of characters or situations from stories that are known property of certain clans is an infringement on the clan's property rights to that story.

Songs are also considered to be property of clans, however since songs are more frequently composed than stories, a clear connection to individuals is felt until that individual dies, at which point the ownership tends to revert to the clan. A number of children's songs or songs sung to children, commonly called 'lullabies', are considered to be in the public domain. However, any song written with a serious intent, be it a love song or a song of mourning, is considered to be the sole property of the owner and may not be sung, recorded, or performed without that clan's permission.

Dances are also considered to be clan property, along the same lines as songs. Since people from different clans are often involved in the performance of a dance, it is considered essential that before the dance is performed or the song sung that a disclaimer be made regarding who permission was obtained from, and with whom the original authorship or ownership rests.

Names are property of a different kind. Most names are inherited, that is they are taken from a deceased relative and applied to a living member of the same clan. However, children are not necessarily given an inherited name while young, instead being given one that seems appropriate to the child, recalls an interesting event in the child's life, or is simply made up on the spot. These names, lacking a strong history, are not considered as important as those that have passed through many generations, so they are not as carefully defended. Also, some names are 'stolen' from a different clan to make good on an unpaid obligation or debt, and returned when the debt is paid or else passed down through the new clan until it can make a stable claim to ownership of the name.

Places and resources are also considered property, though in a much less clearly defined way than is found in the European legal tradition. Locations are not usually clearly bounded in the Tlingit world, and although sometimes certain landmarks serve as clear boundary markers, ownership of places is usually correlated with a valuable resource in that location rather than overt physical characteristics. Usually the resources in question are food sources, such as salmon streams, herring spawning grounds, berry patches, and fishing holes. However, they are not always immediately apparent, such as the ownership of mountain passes by some clans, which is due to exclusive trading relationships with Athabascans who live in lands accessible by those passes.

Although clan ownership of places is nearly complete in the Tlingit world, with the entirety of Southeast Alaska being divided up into a patchwork of bays, inlets, and rivers belonging to particular clans, this does not in practice provide much of an obstacle to food harvest and travel. Reciprocal relationships between clans guarantee permission for free harvest in most areas to nearly any individual. Since the level of inter-clan disagreements has declined, the attitude towards resource ownership is at a point where few persecute trespass into clan areas, as long as the individuals involved show respect and restraint in their harvest. Note that this only pertains to relations within Tlingit society, and not to relations with the American and Canadian governments or with non-Tlingit individuals.

A hereditary form of slavery was practiced extensively among the Tlingit peoples.  As many as one-third of people in Tlingit society were enslaved.

Potlatch

Potlaches (Tl. koo.éex' ) were held for deaths, births, naming, marriages, sharing of wealth, raising totems, special events, honoring the leaders or the departed.

The memorial potlatch is a major feature of Tlingit culture. A year or two following a person's death this potlatch              was held to restore the balance of the community. Members of the deceased's family were allowed to stop mourning. If the deceased was an important member of the community, like a chief or a shaman for example, at the memorial potlatch his successor would be chosen. Clan members from the opposite moiety took part in the ritual by receiving gifts and hearing and performing songs and stories. The function of the memorial potlatch was to remove the fear from death and the uncertainty of the afterlife.

Art

The Tlingit carve crests on totem poles made of cedar trees. The totem poles carved normally tell a story, and Tlingit artists carve subjects like animals into the totem poles. These pictures are aligned in a column down the pole, in order from top to bottom.

War

Tlingit body armour 

The Tlingits used a body armour made from Chinese cash coins, these coins were introduced by Russian traders from Qing China between the seventeenth and eighteenth centuries who traded them for animal skins which were in turn traded with the Chinese for tea, silk, and porcelain by these European traders. The Tlingits believed that these cash coins would protect them from knife attacks and guns used by other indigenous American tribes and Russians. Some Tlingit body armours are completely covered in Qing dynasty era cash coins while others have them sewn in chevron patterns. One Russian account from a battle with the Tlingits in 1792 states "bullets were useless against the Tlingit armour", however this would have more likely be attributed to the inaccuracy of contemporary Russian smoothbore muskets than the body armour and the Chinese coins might have played a more important role in psychological warfare than have any practical application on the battlefield. Other than on their armour the Tlingits also used Chinese cash coins on masks and ceremonial robes such as the Gitxsan dancing cape as these coins were used as a symbol of wealth representing a powerful far away country. The cash coins used by the Tlingit are all from the Qing dynasty are bear inscriptions of the Shunzhi, Kangxi, and Yongzheng Emperors.

Notable Tlingit
 Nora Marks Dauenhauer
 Chief Shakes
 Elizabeth Peratrovich
 Walter Soboleff
 Ellen Hope Hays
 Chief Saanaheit
 Took̲
 Tayt beaven

References